Isaac "Ike" Southward (15 August 1934 – 6 June 2006) was an English professional rugby league footballer who played in the 1950s and 1960s, and coached in the 1960s.

Background
Ike Southward was born in Maryport, Cumberland, and came from a family of accomplished rugby players, Ike died aged 71 in Workington, Cumbria, England.

Playing career

International honours
Ike Southward won caps for Great Britain while at Workington Town in 1958 against Australia (3 matches) and New Zealand, while at Oldham in 1959 against France (2 matches), and Australia (2 matches), and in 1960 against France (2 matches), and New Zealand.

Ike Southward also represented Great Britain while at Workington Town in 1956 against France (1 non-Test match).

Four Workington players were selected for the 1958 tour of Australia, and New Zealand; Harry Archer, Brian Edgar, Ike Southward and Bill Wookey (later of Barrow).

Challenge Cup Final appearances
Ike Southward played , i.e. number 2, in the 12-21 defeat by Barrow in the 1955 Challenge Cup Final during the 1954-55 season at Wembley Stadium, London on Saturday 30 April 1955, in front of a crowd of 66,513, and played , and scored a try, and three conversions in the 9–13 defeat by Wigan in the 1958 Challenge Cup Final during the 1957–58 season at Wembley Stadium, London on Saturday 10 May 1958.

Club career
Oldham paid Workington Town a straight cash world-record transfer fee of £10,065 for Ike Southward at the start of the 1959–60 Northern Rugby Football League season (based on increases in average earnings, this would be approximately £465,100 in 2013), Workington Town then paid Oldham a straight cash world-record transfer fee of £11,002 10s 0d for Ike Southward during the 1960–61 Northern Rugby Football League season (based on increases in average earnings, this would be approximately £499,300 in 2013), this was £2 10s 0d more than St. Helens had recently paid Wigan for Mick Sullivan.

Career records
Ike Southward holds Workington Town's "Tries in a Career" record (with 274-tries between 1951 and 1968), "Tries in a Match" record (with 7-tries against Blackpool Borough in 1955), and "Consecutive matches in which tries were scored" record (with 10-tries from April to May 1958).

Genealogical information
Ike Southward's marriage to Sarah Elizabeth "Betty" (née McDonald) (birth registered fourth ¼  in Cockermouth district) was registered during third ¼ 1955 in Cockermouth district, they had children; David M. Southward (birth registered second ¼  in Cockermouth district), and Judith E. Southward (birth registered second ¼  in Cockermouth district)

References

External links
!Great Britain Statistics at englandrl.co.uk (statistics currently missing due to not having appeared for both Great Britain, and England)
Statistics at orl-heritagetrust.org.uk
(archived by web.archive.org) » Legends Evening 60's
Encouragement for both coaches after Ike Memorial clash
30 April 1955 Photograph of Workington Town
Obituary in The Independent
Ike’s memorial game to be regular festive fixture
Town Legend Ike Dies Aged 71
Haven first ever winners of Ike Southward Trophy
On your marks in memory of Town legend Ike Southward
Can Stokes defeat bywn dream team?

1934 births
2006 deaths
English rugby league coaches
English rugby league players
Great Britain national rugby league team players
Oldham R.L.F.C. players
Rugby league players from Maryport
Rugby league wingers
Whitehaven R.L.F.C. coaches
Workington Town coaches
Workington Town players